Tankori is a village in the Coalla Department of Gnagna Province in eastern Burkina Faso. The village has a population of 388.

References

External links
Satellite map at Maplandia.com

Populated places in the Est Region (Burkina Faso)
Gnagna Province